Thygesen is a surname. Notable people with the surname include:

Jesper Thygesen (born 1969), Danish football director, commentator and former player
Knut Henning Thygesen (born 1953), Norwegian author and politician
Mikkel Thygesen (born 1984), Danish footballer 
Poul-Erik Thygesen (born 1950), Danish footballer 
Sara Thygesen (born 1991), Danish badminton player

See also
Meanings of minor planet names: 23001–24000#749